Julián Fernández (born 18 July 1989) is an Argentine footballer that plays as centre back for Italian Serie D club S.S.D. F.C. Messina.

Club career
Product of Atlético Rafaela youth ranks, in 2008, Fernández was promoted to the first-adult team. His well performances at Rafaela allowed him be considered in Argentina U-20's 23-man squad for 2009 South American Youth Championship. After his participation for their youth national team, in July, he joined Argentinos Juniors where the defender won the Torneo Clausura 2010 title, which was his first professional honour. However after fail to play at La Paternal-based team, he returned to Rafaela in mid-2011.

On 21 January 2012, Fernández moved Chilean club Deportes La Serena. He debuted against Rangers in a 2–0 away loss at Talca and his first goal came on 11 February in a 1–1 away draw too with Huachipato, which was his first goal in his third game in the tournament, having an impressive season start. On 29 July, Fernández again scored in the tournament, reaching his second goal in a 2–1 home loss with O'Higgins. However after his impressive start at La Portada, the team was gradually deterioring their game to such an extent of relegate to the second-tier, so that he was released.

On 29 October 2019 it was reported that Fernández had joined Italian Serie D club S.S.D. F.C. Messina. However, the deal wasn't confirmed until January 2020, where his finale documents arrived before he officially could sign with Messina.

International career
On 11 January 2009, Fernández was named by the coach Sergio Batista into the 23-man squad of Argentina U-20 for 2009 South American Youth Championship, where internationally debuted on 19 January in a 1–1 with Venezuela (host nation of the youth championship) at Maturín, where appeared as a starter. In principle Batista frequently put him in the starting lineup, but lost the post after a success challenge of Federico Fernández during a tournament, where Argentina failed to qualify to the FIFA U-20 World Cup held in Ghana.

Honours

Club
Argentinos Juniors
 Argentine Primera División (1): 2010 Clausura

References

External links
 
 
 Julián Fernández at Football-Lineups

1989 births
Living people
Argentine footballers
Argentina under-20 international footballers
Argentine expatriate footballers
Atlético de Rafaela footballers
Argentinos Juniors footballers
Deportes La Serena footballers
Talleres de Córdoba footballers
Chacarita Juniors footballers
Real C.D. España players
Chaco For Ever footballers
Sportivo Belgrano footballers
Gimnasia y Esgrima de Mendoza footballers
L.D.U. Loja footballers
S.S.D. F.C. Messina players
Chilean Primera División players
Argentine Primera División players
Primera Nacional players
Primera B Metropolitana players
Ecuadorian Serie B players
Serie D players
Association football central defenders
Argentine expatriate sportspeople in Chile
Argentine expatriate sportspeople in Ecuador
Argentine expatriate sportspeople in Italy
Expatriate footballers in Chile
Expatriate footballers in Ecuador
Expatriate footballers in Italy
Sportspeople from Córdoba Province, Argentina